Dominick Chester (1532—1576) was the member of Parliament for the constituency of Minehead in the parliament of 1563.

The son of a Bristol merchant, he was the brother of Thomas Chester of Almondsbury. He died of the plague.

References

1532 births
1576 deaths
English MPs 1563–1567
16th-century deaths from plague (disease)